Huey, used as a given name, is a variant of Hughie. It may refer to:

People
 Huey (rapper) (1987–2020), American rapper
 Huey Dunbar, Puerto Rican salsa singer
 Huey Johnson (1933–2020), American environmentalist and politician
 Huey Lewis, rock musician, of the band Huey Lewis & the News
 Huey Long (1893–1935), American politician, governor and U.S. Senator from Louisiana, known as "The Kingfish"
 Huey Long (singer) (1904–2009), American musician
 Huey P. Newton (1942–1989), co-founder of the Black Panther Party
 Huey "Piano" Smith (1934–2023), American R&B pianist
 Hugh Morgan of the Fun Lovin' Criminals, known as Huey
 Iain Hewitson, New Zealand-born chef, nicknamed "Huey"
 Laurence Markham Huey (1892–1963), American zoologist
 Michael Huey (disambiguation), multiple people
 Raymond B. Huey (born 1944), American biologist
 Treat Huey, Filipino tennis player

Places
 Huey, Illinois, a village in the United States
 Huey Creek, a glacial meltwater stream in Antarctica

Military
 Bell UH-1 Iroquois, U.S. Army and U.S. Marine Corps utility helicopter nicknamed the "Huey"
 Bell Huey family, helicopters related to the UH-1
 AH-1 Cobra ("HueyCobra"), attack helicopter derived from the UH-1

In fiction
 Huey, Dewey and Louie, Walt Disney characters
 Baby Huey, cartoon character
 Hamster Huey and the Gooey Kablooie, an apocryphal children's book in the comic strip Calvin and Hobbes
 Huey Freeman, the main character in the TV show/comic strip The Boondocks
 Huey Emmerich, a character in the Metal Gear series
 Huey Laforet, a character in the Baccano! series
 Huey, a character in Paper Mario: Color Splash

Other uses
 Huey, a color calibration device from Pantone

See also
 Hughey (disambiguation)